Statistics of Portuguese Liga in the 1946–47 season.

Overview

It was contested by 14 teams, and Sporting Clube de Portugal won the championship.

League standings

Results

Footnotes

Primeira Liga seasons
1946–47 in Portuguese football
Portugal